Landscape with the Finding of Moses is an oil painting on canvas of 1639–40 by Claude Lorrain, one of a series commissioned from the artist by Philip IV of Spain for the Palacio del Buen Retiro. It is now in the collection of the Museo del Prado.

References

Paintings by Claude Lorrain
Paintings of the Museo del Prado by French artists
1640 paintings
Landscape paintings
Lorrain